Oscar-Raymond Bonheur (1796–1849) was a French painter. He is best known as the father of Rosa Bonheur (1822–1899), Auguste Bonheur (1824–1884), Isidore Bonheur (1827–1901), and Juliette Bonheur (1830–1891).

Biography
Bonheur was born in 1796. He was a landscape and portrait painter. He was also follower of Saint-Simonianism He left his wife, Sophie, and his four children to join a Saint-Simonian community. When Sophie died of tuberculosis, he took over the responsibility for his previously abandoned children. He sent his two sons to boarding school and Juliette was sent to live with a family friend. Rosa remained with her father.
 
He died in 1849.

Personal life

Bonheur's family was of Jewish descent.

References

1796 births
1849 deaths
19th-century artists
19th-century French painters
French people of Jewish descent
Saint-Simonists
Artists from Bordeaux